Tishrin is a Syrian town, located just west of Tishrin Dam, in the Aleppo Governorate, Syria.

References 

Aleppo Governorate
Towns in Aleppo Governorate